Yongli (5 February 1647 – 1 June 1662) was the era name of the Yongli Emperor of the Southern Ming.

The Southern Ming was in use for 15 years in mainland China, together with the Kingdom of Tungning in Taiwan, which continued to use the "Yongli" era name until 8 October 1683 (Yongli 37, 18th day of the 8th month), when Zheng Keshuang surrendered to the Qing. On 1 June 1662 (Yongli 15, 15th day of the 4th month), the Yongli Emperor was hanged by Wu Sangui in Kunming, the Southern Ming officially perished, together with the 295-year history of the Ming dynasty, and officially ending nearly three hundred years of Ming rule.

Comparison table

Other regime era names that existed during the same period
 China
 Dingwu (定武, 1646–1664): Southern Ming — era name of Zhu Benli (Zhu Danji), Prince of Han (doubtful)
 Dongwu (東武, 1648): Southern Ming — era name of Zhu Changqing, Prince of Huai
 Shunzhi (順治, 1644–1661): Qing dynasty — era name of the Shunzhi Emperor
 Kangxi (康熙, 1662–1722): Qing dynasty — era name of the Kangxi Emperor
 Zhongxing (中興, 1647): Qing period — era name of the Jiang Erxun (蔣爾恂)
 Tianzheng (天正, 1648): Qing period — era name of Zhang Jintang (張近堂)
 Tianshun (天順, 1661): Qing period — era name of Xiao Weitang (蕭惟堂)
 Daqing (大慶, 1665): Qing period — era name of Wang Yaozu (王耀祖)
 Guangde (廣德, 1673): Qing period — era name of Yang Qilong (楊起隆)
 Zhaowu (昭武, 1678): Wu Zhou — era name of Wu Sangui
 Honghua (洪化, 1679–1681): Wu Zhou — era name of Wu Shifan
 Vietnam
 Thuận Đức (順德, 1638–1677): Mạc dynasty — era name of Mạc Kính Vũ
 Phúc Thái (福泰, 1643–1649): Later Lê dynasty — era name of Lê Chân Tông
 Khánh Đức (慶德, 1649–1653): Later Lê dynasty — era name of Lê Thần Tông
 Thịnh Đức (盛德, 1653–1658): Later Lê dynasty — era name of Lê Thần Tông
 Vĩnh Thọ (永壽, 1658–1662): Later Lê dynasty — era name of Lê Thần Tông
 Vạn Khánh (萬慶, 1662): Later Lê dynasty — era name of Lê Thần Tông
 Cảnh Trị (景治, 1663–1671): Later Lê dynasty — era name of Lê Huyền Tông
 Dương Đức (陽德, 1672–1674): Later Lê dynasty — era name of Lê Gia Tông
 Đức Nguyên (德元, 1674–1675): Later Lê dynasty — era name of Lê Gia Tông
 Vĩnh Trị (永治, 1676–1680): Later Lê dynasty — era name of Lê Hy Tông
 Chính Hòa (正和, 1680–1705): Later Lê dynasty — era name of Lê Hy Tông
 Japan
 Shōhō (正保, 1644–1648): era name of Emperor Go-Kōmyō
 Keian (慶安, 1648–1652): era name of Emperor Go-Kōmyō
 Jōō (承応, 1652–1655): era name of Emperor Go-Kōmyō and Emperor Go-Sai
 Meireki (明暦, 1655–1658): era name of Emperor Go-Sai
 Manji (万治, 1658–1661): era name of Emperor Go-Sai
 Kanbun (寛文, 1661–1673): era name of Emperor Go-Sai and Emperor Reigen
 Enpō (延宝, 1673–1681): era name of Emperor Reigen
 Tenna (天和, 1681–1684): era name of Emperor Reigen

See also
 List of Chinese era names
 List of Ming dynasty era names
 List of rulers of Taiwan

References

Extended reading

Southern Ming eras